Namur is a municipality and city of Belgium, the capital of Wallonia and of the Namur province.

Namur may also refer to:

Places
Namur in Belgium:
Namur (province), a province in Wallonia, Belgium, named after the provincial capital city
Roman Catholic Diocese of Namur
County of Namur, a county of the Carolingian and Holy Roman Empire in the Low Countries (981–1795)
Arrondissement of Namur
Namur, Wisconsin, USA, founded by Walloon immigrants
Namur Historic District, Wisconsin, USA 
Namur, Quebec, a place in Canada, originally settled by Walloon immigrants
Namur Island, former island in the Marshall Islands, now joined by landfill with Roi Island

Organizations
NAMUR, the User Association of Automation Technology in Process Industries
Université de Namur
Notre Dame de Namur University in Belmont, California
UR Namur

Transit
Namur station (Montreal Metro), a metro station in Montreal, Quebec, Canada
Namur railway station (Belgium), in Namur, Belgium

Other
HMS Namur, three ships of the Royal Navy
Citadel of Namur
3374 Namur (1980 KO) is a main-belt asteroid